Grevillea vestita is a shrub which is endemic to the south-west of Western Australia .

Description
It usually grows to about 3 metres in height and has prickly leaves which are deeply lobed and can be up to 50 mm long and 30 mm wide. The scented white, cream or occasionally pale-pink flowers are most abundant from late winter to early spring but can occur sporadically throughout the year.

Taxonomy
The type specimen for this species was collected from King George Sound region and was described by Austrian botanist Stephan Endlicher in 1839 who gave it the name  Manglesia vestita. In 1845 Carl Meissner put the species into the genus Grevillea. The specific epithet is vestita from the Latin word vestitus meaning "covered in hairs"

Subspecies
There are currently two recognised subspecies:

Grevillea vestita (Endl.) Meisn. subsp. vestita 
Grevillea vestita subsp.isopogoides F.Muell. ex McGill. which has smaller leaves with the margins rolled under.

Two former varieties are now regarded as separate species
Grevillea vestita var. angustata Meisn. is now Grevillea curviloba McGill. subsp. curviloba
Grevillea vestita var. stenogyne Benth. is now  Grevillea stenogyne (Benth.) Makinson

Cultivation
This species is noted for being free-flowering and adapts well to cultivation. It can withstand moderate degrees of frost and humidity and responds well to pruning. It can be grown from seed, but is usually propagated by cuttings.

References

vestita
Endemic flora of Western Australia
Eudicots of Western Australia
Proteales of Australia
Garden plants of Australia
Taxa named by Stephan Endlicher
Taxa named by Carl Meissner